Jalawla Sport Club is an Iraqi football team based in Jalawla, Diyala, that plays in Iraq Division Two.

Managerial history

  Najem Abid Awwad
  Anad Abid
  Nadhim Hussein Shihab
  Jassim Mohammed 
  Mazin Salih
  Ahmed Hameed 
  Sardar Mohammed 
  Sattar Ahmed Hawwas

See also 
 1998–99 Iraq FA Cup
 2002–03 Iraq FA Cup
 2019–20 Iraq FA Cup
 2020–21 Iraq FA Cup

References

External links
 Jalawla SC on Goalzz.com
 Iraq Clubs- Foundation Dates

1991 establishments in Iraq
Association football clubs established in 1991
Football clubs in Diyala